Sonatine can refer to:

 Sonatine (1984 film), a Canadian film
 Sonatine (1993 film), a Japanese film
 Sonatine (Ravel), a 1906 piano composition by Maurice Ravel
 Sonatine (Stockhausen), a 1951 chamber music composition by Karlheinz Stockhausen
 Sonatine (ballet), a 1975 ballet choreographed by George Balanchine
 "Sonatine", a 2017 song by Loona from Love & Evil

See also
 Sonatina